Lectionary 274, designated by siglum ℓ 274 (in the Gregory-Aland numbering) is a Greek manuscript of the New Testament, on paper. Palaeographically it has been assigned to the 16th century.
It used to be known as Nanianus 202. The manuscript has complex contents.

Description 

The codex contains lessons from the Gospel of John, Matthew, Luke (Evangelistarium), and from the Acts, Catholic epistles, and Pauline epistles (Apostolarion).
It contains text of the Pericope Adulterae.

The text is written in Greek minuscule letters, on 501 paper leaves, in one column per page, 19 lines per page.

The manuscript contains weekday Gospel/Apostolos lessons from Easter to Pentecost and Saturday/Sunday Gospel lessons for the other weeks.

History 

The manuscript has been assigned by the INTF to the 16th century.

According to the colophon it was written by Emanuel Casimati in 1580.

The manuscript was added to the list of New Testament manuscripts by and Gregory (number 274e). Gregory saw the manuscript in 1886.

The manuscript was examined and described by Carlo Castellani (as lectionary 264).

The manuscript is not cited in the critical editions of the Greek New Testament (UBS3).

The codex is housed at the Biblioteca Marciana (Gr. II,143 (1381)) in Venice.

See also 

 List of New Testament lectionaries
 Biblical manuscript
 Textual criticism
 Lectionary 273

Notes and references

Bibliography 

 
 Carlo Castellani, Catalogus codicum graecorum qui in bibliothecam D. Marci Venetiarum inde ab anno MDCCXL ad haec usque tempora inlati sunt, Venedig 1895, pp. 76–78

Greek New Testament lectionaries
16th-century biblical manuscripts